The 2016 Senior League World Series took place from July 31–August 6 in Bangor, Maine, United States. Chicago, Illinois defeated Melbourne, Australia in the championship game. It was Australia's first world series final in any division of Little League.

This was the final SLWS held in Bangor.

Teams

Results

Group A

Group B

Consolation Round

Elimination Round

References

Senior League World Series
Senior League World Series
Senior
Senior League
Sports competitions in Maine